Dominic Scriven is the founder and current chairman of Dragon Capital, the largest private investor in Vietnam.

Career
Scriven graduated with a combined honours degree in sociology and law from the University of Exeter in England. During his early career he worked in finance positions in the City of London with Vickers, da Costa and in Hong Kong with Sun Hung Kai Properties. In the early 1990s he visited Vietnam and noticed the economic opportunities there. He then spent 2 years studying at Hanoi General University learning Vietnamese. He was then asked by Peregrine Investments Holdings founder Philip Tose to help set up its Vietnam offices. In 1994 he co-founded Dragon Capital.

In 2006 he was awarded the Order of the British Empire and in 2014, he was awarded the Labor Order award, third class, by the Vietnamese president Trương Tấn Sang.

Scriven was a director on the board of the Asia Commercial Bank.

Despite calling Vietnam "not communist", he has been an advisor to the State Bank of Vietnam and the national pension program.

Personal life
Scriven collects Vietnamese socialist realist art and established a wildlife conservation organisation. Scriven has no children and resides in a villa in Ho Chi Minh City's District 2. He also owns an eco-resort at Phu Quoc.

He is fluent in Vietnamese and in 2016 and 2019, Scriven stated that he was in the process of obtaining the Vietnamese nationality.

References

Officers of the Order of the British Empire
1963 births
British investors
Living people